was a Japanese designer of ukiyo-e art.  He inherited the name Hiroshige II following the death in 1858 of his master Hiroshige, whose daughter he married.  In 1865 he moved from Edo to Yokohama after dissolving his marriage and began using the name Kisai Risshō (喜斎立祥; alternate pronunciation: Ryūshō).  His work so resembles that of his master that scholars have often confused them.

Life and career

Born Suzuki Chinpei in 1826, it is said that he was born to a fireman, as was his master Hiroshige to whom he became apprenticed under the name Shigenobu at an unknown age.  His earliest known work is the illustrations for a book called Twenty-four Paragons of Japan and China from 1849.

In 1858, he married Hiroshige I's daughter Otatsu after the master's death and inherited the Hiroshige name, as well as the names Ichiryūsai and Ryūsai.

The artist moved from Edo to Yokohama in 1865 after dissolving his marriage and began using the name Kisai Risshō (喜斎立祥; alternate pronunciation: Ryūshō).  During this decade he produced a number of collaborative print series, particularly with Kunisada, who had earlier worked with Hiroshige I.  In his final years he turned mainly to decorating works intended for export, such as tea chests, kites, and lanterns. On 17 September 1869 he died at the age of 44.

Hiroshige I took on few students; Hiroshige II was the most successful of these.  His works have often been confounded with those of his master, which they resemble closely in style, subject, and signature.  Early Western scholars did not even recognize him as a separate artist.

Another pupil of the first Hiroshige, Shigemasa, later married the master's daughter, Otatsu, and also began using the name Hiroshige; this artist now is known as Hiroshige III.

Galleries

See also

Utagawa school
List of Utagawa school members

References

Works cited

Further reading

 'Hiroshige II' in: Forbes, Andrew; Henley, David (2014). 100 Famous Views of Edo. Chiang Mai: Cognoscenti Books. ASIN: B00HR3RHUY
 Lane, Richard. (1978).  Images from the Floating World, The Japanese Print. Oxford: Oxford University Press. ; OCLC 5246796
 Newland, Amy Reigle. (2005). Hotei Encyclopedia of Japanese Woodblock Prints.  Amsterdam: Hotei. ; OCLC 61666175

External links

Prints 
Catalogue Raisonné of the Work of Utagawa Hiroshige II
Ukiyo-e Prints by Utagawa Hiroshige II

Biographies 
Biography of Utagawa Hiroshige II, British Museum

1826 births
1869 deaths
Ukiyo-e artists
Utagawa school